Somerset County Airport  is a county-owned public airport three miles northeast of Somerset, a borough in Somerset County, Pennsylvania. The National Plan of Integrated Airport Systems for 2011–2015 categorized it as a general aviation facility.

Facilities
The airport covers 231 acres (93 ha) at an elevation of 2,275 feet (693 m). It has two runways: 7/25 is 5,002 by 75 feet (1,525 x 23 m) asphalt; 14/32 is 2,695 by 204 feet (821 x 62 m) asphalt and turf.

In the year ending October 24, 2011 the airport had 21,430 aircraft operations, average 58 per day: 86% general aviation, 12% military, and 2% air taxi. 31 aircraft were then based at the airport: 81% single-engine, 13% ultralight, and 6% multi-engine.

References

External links 
 Somerset County Airport at Somerset County website
 Somerset County Airport (2G9) at Pennsylvania DOT Airport Directory
 Aerial image as of April 1993 from USGS The National Map
 

Airports in Pennsylvania
County airports in Pennsylvania
Transportation buildings and structures in Somerset County, Pennsylvania